The Thunder Bay Bandits are a Canadian junior B ice hockey team based in Thunder Bay, Ontario. They play in the Lakehead Junior Hockey League eligible to compete for the Keystone Cup Junior B championship of Western Canada.

History
The Thunder Bay Stars joined the Thunder Bay Junior B Hockey League in 2009. The team was formed after the K&A Wolverines accepted an invitation to play Junior A in the Superior International Junior Hockey League.

In both 2010 and 2011, the Stars finished third in the regular season, but managed to upset the second place Nipigon Elks in the league semi-finals to earn entrance into the league finals. In both cases, the Stars were defeated by the Thunder Bay Northern Hawks.

At the end of the 2016–17 season, long-time Stars owners Dave and Scott Simpson sold the franchise to Derek Geddes. The team was rebranded as the Thunder Bay Fighting Walleye.

For the 2018 season British Columbia, Alberta, and Saskatchewan elected not to participate in the Keystone Cup. As a result, the tournament was reorganized to feature the LJHL and KJHL champion and runner-up. Although the Thunder Bay Northern Hawks won the LJHL championship, the new format allowed the Fighting Walleye make their first Keystone Cup tournament. They returned to the Keystone Cup the following season as well, and then were awarded hosting duties for the 2020 tournament. However, the 2020 tournament would be cancelled due to the COVID-19 pandemic.

Prior to the 2020–21 season the team rebranded once again as the Kam River Pickerel, but was instead sold and rebranded again as Thunder Bay Bandits.

Season-by-season standings

Keystone Cup history
Central Canadian Jr. B Championships (Northern Ontario to Saskatchewan)

References

Ice hockey teams in Ontario
Sport in Thunder Bay